Marcelo Méndez (born 23 March 1956) is an Argentine fencer. He competed in the team sabre event at the 1976 Summer Olympics.

References

1956 births
Living people
Argentine male fencers
Argentine sabre fencers
Olympic fencers of Argentina
Fencers at the 1976 Summer Olympics
Pan American Games medalists in fencing
Pan American Games bronze medalists for Argentina
Fencers at the 1975 Pan American Games
20th-century Argentine people